Verena Mei (born in Pearl City, Hawaii) is a Chinese-American model and rally car driver.

Modeling and acting career
Mei began her career as a poster model for tire companies. Mei is credited with minor appearances in Carolina, Rush Hour 2, and The Fast and the Furious: Tokyo Drift.

Racing career
In 2002, Mei entered a stunt driving school and earned a professional competition drag racing license. Mei competed in Formula Drift for five years and became the first female to win the Redline Time Attack Series.

In 2012, Mei won the Rally America B-Spec National Championship together with co-driver Leanna Junnila in their first year of competition, becoming the first all-female team to ever win a national title in the history of Rally America.

References

External links

 MISC - "Verena Mei on the Future of Motorsports"
 Oprah Magazine - Issue April 2016
 VICE Sports Germany
 Banana Magazine - Issue #004

1981 births
Female models from Hawaii
Actresses from Hawaii
Racing drivers from Hawaii
American rally drivers
Drifting drivers
Formula D drivers
Living people
American television personalities
American women television personalities
People from Honolulu County, Hawaii
21st-century American women